A Trumpet in the Wadi is a 1987 novel by Sami Michael. It details a love story between a Russian Jewish immigrant and an Arab Christian woman in the Wadi Nisnas of Haifa. The novel has been adapted for the stage five times in Israel, as well as for a film in 2001. The film version of the book won many prizes–First Prize at Haifa International Film Festival, the Haifa Culture Foundation prize, the Israeli Academy prize for Best Drama, First Prize in the Film Festival for Love Stories in Russia, and Best Actor at the Geneva Festival.
 
A Trumpet in the Wadi has been translated into English (New York, Simon & Schuster 2003), Dutch (Amsterdam, 1996), German (Berlin, 1996, 2008), French (Paris, 2006), Italian (Florence, 2006), Persian (Los Angeles, 2006), and Chinese (Beijing, 2009).

See also
 Seres queridos

External links
A Trumpet in the Wadi, the New York Jewish Times
A Trumpet in the Wadi, The Jewish Daily Forward
A Trumpet in the Wadi, Refugee Week
The Washington Post | August 22, 2003 | Carolyn See

1987 novels
20th-century Israeli novels
Novels set in Israel
Am Oved books